YVP, or yvp, may refer to:

 YVP, the IATA code for Kuujjuaq Airport in Quebec, Canada
 YVP, the National Rail code for Yeovil Pen Mill railway station in Somerset, UK

 See also